Buddi is a children's animated streaming television series created by Jason Jameson for Netflix that won an Annie Award nomination in 2021 (Best TV/Media—Preschool). It is also shown on Australian TV network ABC. The plot revolves around the Buddis consisting of Cini, Vihi, Iso, Kelta and Puna. The names are derived from Finnish language; Cini (sini) meaning blue, Vihi meaning green, Iso translates as Big, Kelta meaning Yellow and Puna meaning Red. The series premiered on March 20, 2020.

Second season was released on September 11, 2020.

Buddi website: https://www.buddiworld.com

Characters
 Cini is a happy, jolly, squishy little bubble bag. The most cheerful and enthusiastic Buddi. Like Iso’s horn or Vihi’s light, Cini also has a special skill, in his case being able to make images appear out of the top of his head using his Thought Bubble. The leader of the Five. 
 Vihi is the youngest, most sensitive, emotional and compassionate Buddi. Vihi moves around on six dainty legs, making her a highly creative dancer and an excellent swimmer. From the top of her head, Vihi shines a bright light that not only amplifies her emotions but can also be used as a handy torch. Vihi can be shy and timid, and sometimes a little fearful. 
 Puna is the most protective, responsible and cautious Buddi. Being the tallest, Puna can often spot problems ahead from his bird’s eye view. Nothing makes Puna happier than being close to Kelta, and together this endearing sibling duo often find solutions to the challenges that face the Buddis. 
 Kelta - riding high on his big brother’s shoulders, Kelta is a curious young Buddi with a hand that’s always reaching out for a new adventure. Kelta often tests his independence but, after a while, truly misses his big brother, and will throw his arm around loyal Puna when they are re-united. 
 Iso is the oldest, largest and speediest Buddi. Iso has a tendency to act cheeky and show off. Iso’s emotional reactions and ability to communicate are often expressed through the horn that stands proudly on her side. Iso can even make her horn let out a fart sound if it will lead to a heap of Buddi giggles.

Episodes

Season 1 (2020)

Season 2 (2020)

Release
Buddi was released on March 20, 2020 on Netflix.

References

External links
 
 
 Buddi website https://www.buddiworld.com

2020s British animated television series
2020 British television series debuts
2020 British television series endings
2020 Chinese television series debuts
2020 Chinese television series endings
2020s preschool education television series
American children's animated adventure television series
American children's animated comedy television series
American children's animated fantasy television series 
Animated preschool education television series
Animated television series about children
British children's animated adventure television series
British children's animated comedy television series
British children's animated fantasy television series
British computer-animated television series
British preschool education television series
Chinese children's animated adventure television series
Chinese children's animated comedy television series
Chinese children's animated fantasy television series
Netflix children's programming
English-language Netflix original programming